Coleophora pellicornella is a moth of the family Coleophoridae. It is found in Turkey, Spain, Portugal but also China.

References

pellicornella
Moths of Europe
Moths of Asia
Moths described in 1930